Goa is a village in the province of Nayala in Burkina Faso. 
Goa has a population of 651.

References

Nayala Province
Populated places in the Boucle du Mouhoun Region